KQKI-FM (95.3 FM) is a radio station broadcasting a country music format. Licensed to Bayou Vista, Louisiana, United States, the station serves St. Mary Parish and surrounding areas.  The station is currently owned by Teche Broadcasting Company.

The station is notable in that it plays an occasional song from the swamp pop genre inserted into their normal country music playlist.  The station is an affiliate of the New Orleans Saints radio network.

History
KQKI-FM came onto the air in 1976 as a 3,000 watt station serving the St. Mary parish area in addition to their KQKI AM station already on the air. In 1995 they upgraded to their current 16,500 watt signal and closed permanently the AM station in 1996.

References

External links

Radio stations in Louisiana
Country radio stations in the United States
Radio stations established in 1976
1976 establishments in Louisiana